Sarah Ousfar (born July 28, 1993 in Lille, France) is a French basketball player who plays for club Basket Landes of the League feminine de basket the top league of basketball for women in France.

References

French women's basketball players
1993 births
Sportspeople from Lille
Living people